is a railway station in the town of Yamanouchi, Nagano, Japan, operated by the private railway operating company Nagano Electric Railway.

Lines
Kamijō Station is a station on the Nagano Electric Railway Nagano Line. It is 1.4 kilometers from Yudanaka Terminus and 31.8 kilometers from the terminus of the line at Nagano Station. The station began operating April 28, 1927. In 1970, the station was no longer staffed. In September 2006, major renovations were completed at Yudanaka Station. During that time, Kamijō was terminus for the Nagaden Train, and passengers were bussed to Yudanaka. In 2011, Kamijō was excluded from Limited B Express trains.

Station layout
The station consists of one ground-level side platform serving a single bi-directional track. The station is unattended.

Adjacent stations

History
The station opened on 28 April 1927.

Surrounding area
The station is located in a rural area surrounded by apple orchards.

Passenger statistics
In fiscal 2015, the station was used by an average of 21 passengers daily (boarding passengers only).

See also
 List of railway stations in Japan

References

External links

 

Railway stations in Japan opened in 1927
Railway stations in Nagano Prefecture
Nagano Electric Railway
Yamanouchi, Nagano